Swaminatha Swamy Temple is a Hindu temple dedicated to god Murugan. It is located in Swamimalai, 5 km from Kumbakonam, on the banks of a tributary of river Kaveri in Thanjavur District, 250 km from Chennai, the capital of Tamil Nadu, India. The temple is fourth abode of Murugan among six (Arupadaiveedugal). The shrine of the presiding deity, Swaminathaswamy is located atop a  hillock and the shrine of his mother Meenakshi (Parvathi) and father Shiva (Sundareswarar) is located downhill. The temple has three gopuram (gateway towers), three precincts and sixty steps and each one is named after the sixty Tamil years. The temple has six daily rituals at various times from 5:30 a.m. to 9 p.m., and three yearly festivals on its calendar. The annual Vaikasi Visagam festival is attended by thousands of devotees from far and near.

As per Hindu legend, Muruga, the son of Shiva, extolled the meaning of the Pranava Mantra (AUM) to his father at this place and hence attained the name Swaminathaswamy. The temple is believed to be in existence from the Sangam period from 2nd century BC and was believed to have been modified and rebuilt by Parantaka Chola I. The temple was greatly damaged during the Anglo-French war between Hyder Ali and British in 1740. The temple, in modern times, is maintained and administered by the Hindu Religious and Charitable Endowments Department of the Government of Tamil Nadu.The 
Kandhanathaswamy thirukovil in eraharam is connected to the history of this temple

Nearby Eraharam Murugan temple 

In the village of Eraharam there is a murugan temple known as Kandhanathaswamy thirukovil. This temple is considered to be the adhi temple of Swamimalai Swaminathaswamy temple. This Kandhanathaswamy temple can be reacher from kumbakonam and from thirupurambiyam.

Legend 

As per Hindu legend, Brahma, the Hindu god of creation, disrespected Muruga (the son of Shiva) at the time of visiting Mount Kailash, the abode of Shiva. The child Muruga got angry with Brahma and asked him how he was creating living beings. Brahma said that he was creating living beings with the help of the Vedas (Hindu scriptures). On hearing the reply, Muruga asked Brahma to recite the texts from Vedas. Brahma started to recite the text with the holy word called Pranav Mantra, "Om". At that time Muruga stopped Brahma and asked him to explain the meaning of the Pranava Mantra. Brahma did not expect such a question from the child and could not reply. Muruga knocked Brahma on his forehead with his clenched fists and punished him with imprisonment. Muruga took up the role of the creator. The Devas (celestial deities) were surprised by the absence of Brahma and they requested Vishnu to negotiate with Muruga to release Brahma. Vishnu could not help and as the last resort, Shiva went to the rescue of Brahma.

Shiva came to Muruga and asked him to release Brahma from imprisonment. Muruga refused to release him stating Brahma was unaware of the meaning of the Om - (Pranav Mantra-Tamil: ௐ  AUM). Shiva asked Muruga to explain the meaning and Muruga extolled to Shiva the meaning of Om. Shiva behaved like a student to a teacher,  listening with rapt attention from his son, giving Muruga the name "Swaminatha Swami". The meaning of this name is "The Teacher of Shiva". Following the legend, the shrine of the son Muruga is atop the hillock, while the father Shiva's shrine is located at the basement.

As per the Kanda Puranam, once all sages and gods assembled in Kailash to witness the wedding of Shiva with Parvathi. It resulted in the tilting of earth towards one direction. Shiva asked sage Agasthya to move towards South to balance the tilt. Agastya employed a demon by name Ettumba to carry two hills in his shoulders to be placed in the South. The demon carried the hills down south and rested in a place. When he tried to lift one of the hills, it didn't budge and he found a young man standing at the top of the hill not allowing it to be moved. The demon tried to attack the young man, but was smitten. Sage Agastya identified the young man as Karthikeya and asked him to pardon the demon. Karthikeya readily did so and let the hill remain there at Pazhani. It is a practice followed in the modern times where people carry milk in both their shoulders as a devotion to please Karthikeya. The demon carried the other hill to Swamimalai.

Architecture

In Swamimalai, Muruga is known as "Balamurugan" and "Swaminatha Swami". The temple is built on an artificial hill. In Tamil language, such an artificial hill is called "Kattu Malai".Earlier it was called as "Thiruveragam". The temple has three gopuram (gateway towers) and three precincts. Out of the three precincts, one is located in the basement, the second at midway to the top of the hillock and the third on the hillock, around the sanctum of the Swaminathaswamy shrine. There are sixty steps and each one is named after the sixty Tamil years. The first thirty steps lead to the second precinct of the temple. There are golden armours, golden crowns and a diamond lance for Swaminathaswamy. There is a shrine of Vinayagar outside the first precinct. The central shrine houses the granite image of Swaminathaswamy. The first precinct has the images of Dakshinamurthy, Durga, Chandikeswarar and the festival image of Swaminathaswamy. The images of Sundaresawar as lingam (Shiva) and Meenakshi (Parvathi) are located down hill and the first precinct around their shrines have the images of Dakshinamurthy, Durga, Chandikeswarar and Navagrahas. The second precinct and the largest one of the temple houses a marriage hall and the chariot of the temple. The temple is one of the most visited temples in the district. The original animal mount of Murugan is believed to have been an elephant, compared to the peacock which is considered to be the most common mount. The white elephant, is considered a powerful, terror striking animal. The iconography is maintained only in two places, namely, this temple and Tiruttani Murugan Temple. Unlike other Murugan temples, where peacock is sported axial to the image of the presiding deity, an elephant is seen in front of Murugan in the temple. The temple is maintained and administered by the Hindu Religious and Charitable Endowments Department of the Government of Tamil Nadu.

Religious importance

Swamimalai is one of the Arupadaiveedu, believed to be the six main abodes of Muruga, that mark the different phases of his life.  According to Hindu belief, Swamimalai is where Muruga preached what as called as "Pranava mantra" to his own father, Shiva, at a young age, after arresting Brahma for not answering his question about Pranava Mantram. The teaching capabilities of Murugan is found as one of his identifying features. The cult of Murugan is of pride to the Tamil people who identify six with Murugan connating six directions and six chakras in human anatomy.

According to Hindu legend, Mahalingaswamy at Thiruvidaimarudur is the centre of all Shiva temples in the region and the Saptha Vigraha moorthis (seven prime consorts in all Shiva temples) are located at seven cardinal points around the temple, located in various parts of the state. The seven deities are Nataraja in Chidambaram Nataraja Temple at Chidambaram, Chandikeswarar temple at Tirucheingalur, Vinayagar in Vellai Vinayagar Temple at Thiruvalanchuzhi, Muruga in Swamimalai Murugan Temple at Swamimalai, Bhairava in Sattainathar Temple at Sirkali, Navagraha in Sooriyanar Temple at Suryanar Kovil and Dakshinamoorthy in Apatsahayesvarar Temple, Alangudi at Alangudi, Papanasam taluk.

Arunagirinathar was a 15th-century Tamil poet born in Tiruvannamalai. He spent his early years as a rioter and seducer of women. After ruining his health, he tried to commit suicide by throwing himself from the northern tower of Annamalaiyar Temple, but was saved by the grace of Murugan. He became a staunch devotee and composed Tamil hymns glorifying Murugan, the most notable being Thirupugazh. Arunagirinathar visited various Murugan temples and on his way back to Tiruvannamalai, visited Swamimalai and sung praises about Swaminathaswamy.

Worship and religious practises

The temple priests perform the puja (rituals) during festivals and on a daily basis. Like other Shiva temples of Tamil Nadu, the priests belong to the Shaiva community, a Brahmin sub-caste. The temple rituals are performed six times a day; Ushathkalam at 5:30 a.m., Kalasanthi at 8:00 a.m., Uchikalam at 10:00 a.m., Sayarakshai at 5:00 p.m., Irandamkalam at 7:00 p.m. and Ardha Jamam at 8:00 p.m. Each ritual comprises four steps: abhisheka (sacred bath), alangaram (decoration), naivethanam (food offering) and deepa aradanai (waving of lamps) for Swaminathaswamy. The worship is held amidst music with nagaswaram (pipe instrument) and tavil (percussion instrument), religious instructions in the Vedas (sacred texts) read by priests and prostration by worshippers in front of the temple mast. There are monthly rituals like amavasai (new moon day), kiruthigai, pournami (full moon day) and sathurthi. The major festival of the temple, Vaikasi Visagam, is celebrated during the Tamil month of Vaikasi (May -June). As per Hindu legend, the celestial deity Indra worshipped Subramanyaswamy on the day of visagam star and gained strength to defeat the demon Arikesa. Like other Murugan temples, the worship practises include tonsuring in the temple, ablution of the deity with sandal, panchamirtham (a mixture of five ingredients) and milk are performed by devotees. Carrying milk pots (called palkudam) and Kavadi are other common forms of worship. A few years ago, a popular event called Subramanya Sahasranama, meaning doing archana with 1008 forms of Muruga was celebrated every month. Like in Palani Murugan temple, Vibhuti Abhishekam, the ablution of the central deity with ash is performed. The central deity with adorned with diamond Vel every Thursday. The kumbabhisekam of the temple was performed on 9 September 2015.

Kumbakonam Sapta Stana Temple
This is one of the Saptha Stana Temples of Kumbakonam. During the Mahahaman of 2016 the palanquin festival was held on 7 February 2016. Following the tirttavari held at Mahamaham tank on 21 April 2016, the palanquin festival of the Sapta Stana Temples were held on 23 April 2016. The festival which started from Kumbesvara Temple at the 7.30 p.m. of 23 April 2016 completed on the morning of 25 April 2016 after going to the following temples.  
 
 Adi Kumbeswarar Temple, Kumbakonam  
 Amirthakadeswarar Temple, Sakkottai  
 Avudainathar Temple, Darasuram 
 Kabartheeswarar Temple 
 Kottaiyur Kodeeswarar Temple 
 Kailasanathar Temple, Melakaveri
 Swaminatha Swamy Temple

Notes

References

External links

Hindu temples in Thanjavur district
Murugan temples in Tamil Nadu
Kaumaram